Darryl Eugene Strawberry (born March 12, 1962) is an American former professional baseball right fielder and author who played 17 seasons in Major League Baseball (MLB). Throughout his career, Strawberry was one of the most feared sluggers in the sport, known for his prodigious home runs and his intimidating presence in the batter's box with his  frame and his long, looping swing that elicited comparisons to Ted Williams.

He was also suspended three times by MLB for substance abuse, leading to many narratives about his massive potential going unfulfilled. A popular player during his career, Strawberry was voted to the All-Star Game eight straight times from 1984 to 1991. Strawberry was formerly an analyst for SportsNet New York. His memoir, Straw: Finding My Way, written with author John Strausbaugh, was published in April 2009.

Early life and education
Strawberry was born to Henry and Ruby Strawberry in Los Angeles, California. He played high school baseball for the Crenshaw High School Cougars along with Chris Brown. Darryl's older brother Michael Strawberry was also a star baseball athlete who would play professional baseball.

Baseball career
Strawberry was drafted first overall in the 1980 Major League Baseball draft by the New York Mets. Darryl's older brother, Michael Strawberry, was also selected in that draft, going to the Dodgers in the 31st round.

Early career
Employing a distinctive batting stance with a high leg kick, Strawberry rose through the Mets system and reached the major league level in 1983, posting 26 home runs, 7 triples, and 74 runs batted in, while hitting for a .257 average. He was named the National League's Rookie of The Year. In 1984, he made it to the All-Star game for the first of 8 consecutive appearances (the first 5 as a starter), and he once again hit 26 home runs, this time driving in 97 runs.

Prime years
Strawberry's Mets from 1984–1990 formed one of the premier teams in the National League, finishing either first or second in the division every year.

During the period from 1983 to 1990, Strawberry was very popular, with his image used on action figures (Kenner's Starting Lineup), posters and banners. He was also known for his disruptive behavior. He got into a physical altercation on team picture day with team captain Keith Hernandez and in the midst of a war of words with infielder Wally Backman, threatened to "bust that little redneck in the face". He often overslept and was late for, or missed, team workouts. He publicly complained about manager Davey Johnson after he was removed from the game in a double switch during the ninth inning of Game 6 of the 1986 World Series, which the Mets would go on to win. During the regular season in 1986, Strawberry hit 27 home runs and had 93 RBIs.

In 1987, Strawberry hit 39 home runs and stole 36 bases, joining the exclusive 30–30 club at the time becoming one of only 10 players in baseball history to accomplish the feat. In addition to that, he hit 32 doubles and drove in 104 runs. Despite this, the 1987 team missed the playoffs.

In 1988, Strawberry once again hit 39 home runs to lead the National League. He also led the league in slugging percentage at .545 and OPS at .911 and finished second with 101 runs batted in. He finished a very close second in MVP voting to the Dodgers' Kirk Gibson. Strawberry led the Mets to the playoffs, losing to the Dodgers in seven games in the National League Championship Series.

In 1989, Strawberry's offensive numbers declined: he had 29 home runs and 77 runs batted in, but only had a .225 average. Nevertheless, the Mets came in a close second place to the Chicago Cubs in the National League East.

In 1990, Strawberry rebounded by hitting 37 home runs, driving in 108 runs and batting for a .277 average. His Mets, however, came once again in a close second place in the National League East, losing to the Pittsburgh Pirates by three games. Strawberry himself finished third in MVP voting that season.

Strawberry signed as a free agent with the Los Angeles Dodgers on November 8, 1990, inking a lucrative five-year $22.25 million contract. In California, he was named Big Brother of The Year for 1991. After hitting 28 home runs and bringing in 99 runs batted in a successful first year for the Dodgers, injuries and personal problems kept him sidelined for much of the next two seasons, hitting five home runs in each season.

By the end of the 1991 season, he had 280 lifetime homers at the age of only 29, drawing comparisons to then home run king Hank Aaron.

Later years
Strawberry's numbers tailed off considerably after 1991; over the next two years he only played in 75 games. In 1994, he was released in May by the Dodgers after failing to show up to a game. Later that season he signed with the San Francisco Giants, where he saw limited playing time as he tried to make a comeback, hitting only four home runs and driving in 17 runs that year.

After a suspension at the beginning of 1995 after testing positive for cocaine, Strawberry signed with the New York Yankees for the stretch run. The next year, Darryl signed with the Saint Paul Saints of the Northern League on May 3, 1996, in an attempt to rehabilitate. On June 2, the Saints faced the Duluth–Superior Dukes at Wade Stadium, where Strawberry hit his first home run for the Saints, at a distance of 522' off of pitcher Pat Ahearne. Soon thereafter, he found himself back with the Yankees, who signed him on July 4, 1996.

With the Yankees, he showed flashes of his former brilliance, belting 11 home runs in a part-time role and helping his team win the World Series in 1996 alongside former Mets teammates Dwight Gooden and David Cone. His second career three-homer game came against the Chicago White Sox on August 6 of that season.

He had a big series against the Baltimore Orioles in the 1996 ALCS as he blasted three home runs with five RBIs and a .417 average in four games. In 1997, he did not have any home runs, with his playing time limited by injuries. He played in just 11 games that year, collecting just two runs batted in.

In 1998, he had 24 home runs, once again helping the Yankees win the World Series and playing 100 games for the first time since 1991. However, he suffered abdominal pain for around two months, which he did not disclose to his teammates or staff, and his playing time declined late in the season. Strawberry was diagnosed with colon cancer during the American League Division Series (ALDS), and he was replaced on the roster by rookie Ricky Ledée. In 1999, he made a comeback from his cancer treatment, but saw limited playing time, hitting 3 home runs. He did however hit a crucial 3-run home run against the Texas Rangers in the ALDS, helping the Yankees advance to the ALCS.

Strawberry was set to return to the Yankees in 2000, but after testing positive for cocaine in February while attending spring training, Strawberry was ordered to leave the team while waiting for commissioner Bud Selig to make a decision on a possible suspension. Six days after news of the positive test broke, Selig announced that Strawberry would be suspended for the entire 2000 season, effectively ending his career.

Career accomplishments
Strawberry was the starting right fielder five straight times and appeared at nine All-Star games. He batted .333 with two stolen bases and two runs in 12 career All-Star at-bats. He had two three-home run games in his career, both of which came against Chicago teams and were almost 11 years to the day between each other. The first came against the Cubs on August 5, 1985, and the second was on August 6, 1996, against the White Sox.

He is one of only five Major League Baseball players to hit two pinch-hit grand slams in the same season. The others are his former coach Davey Johnson, who did it as a member of the Philadelphia Phillies, as well as Mike Ivie of the San Francisco Giants, Ben Broussard of the Cleveland Indians, and Brooks Conrad of the Atlanta Braves.

He is one of only three players in MLB history, along with former Yankees teammate Ricky Ledée and José Vizcaíno, to have played for all four of the former and current New York-based MLB teams- the Mets, Yankees, Dodgers and Giants.

Post-playing life

Strawberry attended the Mets' 1986 World Champion team reunion on August 19, 2006, where the team received a standing ovation from fans at Shea Stadium in an on-field ceremony. He worked as an instructor for the New York Mets in 2005 and 2008, and was inducted to the Mets Hall of Fame in 2010.

He has made regular appearances at the New York Yankees' Old Timer's Day, most recently in 2012.

He threw out the ceremonial first pitch at Shea Stadium before Game 1 of the National League Championship Series between the Mets and the St. Louis Cardinals on October 12, 2006. He was given a rousing ovation by the Shea Stadium crowd. He served as an anchor on the Mets pre- and post- game shows on SNY in 2007 and 2008, eventually settling into a part-time analysis role for the 2009 season.

He opened his own restaurant, Strawberry's Sports Grill, in Douglaston, Queens in August 2010. The restaurant closed in October 2012.

Personal life
Strawberry is an evangelical born-again Christian and has appeared on The Trinity Broadcasting Network. In 1999, he and Tiny Lister appeared on evangelist Benny Hinn's T.V. program giving their testimonies. Strawberry has also appeared on The 700 Club to talk about his life and his newfound faith in Jesus.

Strawberry frequently donates to charity and was a headliner of the BGC Charity Day event at BGC Partners in 2010.

In October 2005, his wife Charisse filed for divorce.

He now resides in St. Charles County, Missouri with his third wife Tracy whom he met in a drug recovery convention. The couple were married in October 2006 and have since founded "The Darryl Strawberry Foundation", an organization dedicated to children with autism. Strawberry's son, Darryl "D.J." Strawberry, Jr., born in 1985, was a star shooting guard with the Maryland Terrapins men's basketball team and was drafted by the Phoenix Suns in the 2007 NBA Draft. Strawberry has another son, Jordan, who played college basketball for the Mercer Bears.

Strawberry has stated that his father was an alcoholic who was verbally and physically abusive to him and his brothers. He attributes his initial alcohol and drug use to the pain he endured as a child and his subsequent substance abuse to the pressures of performing in New York.

On September 26, 2020, Strawberry led a prayer in the 2020 Franklin Graham Prayer March.

Legal and health problems

On December 19, 1995, Strawberry was charged in California with failing to make child support payments. When he missed a June 5, 1996, deadline to pay the child support, a Los Angeles judge set a trial date of July 17, at which time Strawberry agreed to use his signing bonus to pay the debt.

In August 1998, Strawberry was sued by attorney Robert Shapiro for failing to pay $100,000 in legal fees, dating back to 1994, when Shapiro represented him in a contract with the Dodgers.

On October 1, 1998, Strawberry was diagnosed with colon cancer. Two days later, he had surgery to remove a tumor and 24 inches of his colon. On October 14, doctors announced that cancer had been detected in a lymph node so he would also have to undergo chemotherapy.

On April 3, 1999, Strawberry was arrested in Tampa, Florida for soliciting sex from a policewoman posing as a prostitute and for having a small amount of cocaine. On April 24, he was suspended for 140 days by Major League Baseball for the incident. On May 29, he pleaded no contest to the charges and was sentenced to 21 months probation and community service.

On July 28, 2000, a C.T. scan suggested that Strawberry's cancer had spread to his lymph nodes. The next month, he had surgery to remove a tumor near his left kidney on August 7.

On September 11, 2000, in Tampa, Florida, Strawberry tried to drive to see his probation officer after taking painkillers. While driving, he blacked out, rear-ended another car, and then tried to drive away. An off-duty police officer witnessed the episode and arrested him at gunpoint. The next day, Strawberry admitted to the charges and his probation was changed to two years of house arrest. On November 21, he was sentenced to a year of probation and community service. On October 25, 2000, Strawberry left a Tampa drug treatment center to use drugs with a female friend, violating his house arrest and parole. On November 9, he was sentenced to 40 days in jail with credit for time served. On November 3, 2000, Strawberry told a judge in Tampa that he had lost his will to live and had stopped chemotherapy. On November 30, he was released from jail and sent back to rehab. On April 2, 2001, Strawberry was arrested for again disappearing from his house arrest drug treatment center in Tampa. On May 1, he was sentenced to more time at a drug treatment center.

On March 12, 2002, Strawberry was back in jail for violating several non-drug rules at the drug treatment center where he was on probation in Ocala, Florida. On April 29, he was ordered to serve the 22-month suspended prison sentence from 1999. On April 8, 2003, he was released from prison after 11 months.

In September 2005, Strawberry was charged with filing a false police report after he claimed his SUV was stolen. He admitted that he had lied on the report but was not arrested because it was a misdemeanor.

Strawberry has described himself as having struggled with a sex addiction. After retirement he admitted to having routinely had sex between innings of MLB games in which he played.

In media

Strawberry appeared on the cover of Sports Illustrated seven times: five times by himself, once with Don Mattingly, and once with Dwight Gooden.

In 1988 he was featured heavily in the William Goldman and Mike Lupica book "Wait Till Next Year" which looked at life inside the Mets over a whole season (among other New York sports teams). It gives a frank account of both his importance to the team and his problematic behaviour.

In 2004, the Rebecca Gilman play The Sweetest Swing in Baseball premiered at the Royal Court Theatre in London. The lead character ‒ Dana, as portrayed by Gillian Anderson ‒ adopts the personality and speech of Darryl Strawberry in an attempt to pass herself off as schizophrenic. The title is a reference to Strawberry's playing skills.

Strawberry appeared, as himself, in The Simpsons episode "Homer at the Bat". He was a featured pro on the second season of the physical reality game show Pros vs. Joes. He currently does occasional commentary for baseball on SportsNet New York.

In 2010, Strawberry appeared on NBC's The Apprentice with Sharon Osbourne, Cyndi Lauper, Bret Michaels, and others. At the end of the third episode, Strawberry was fired after he admitted he was the weakest contestant, was tired, and wanted to go home. Donald Trump agreed and let him go home. After Strawberry made a successful return in the season finale to assist Bret Michaels, Trump made a donation of $25,000 to The Darryl Strawberry Foundation. Strawberry placed 12th.

On February 8, 2011, Strawberry appeared along with Clara Hughes and Stephane Richer on a Canadian documentary by Michael Landsberg to talk about his battle with depression.

On Wednesday, November 15, 2017, Strawberry appeared on The Tonight Show Starring Jimmy Fallon to talk about his new book Don't Give Up on Me, which sheds light on addiction and recovery.

See also

List of Major League Baseball annual home run leaders
List of Major League Baseball career home run leaders

References

External links

Darryl Strawberry st SABR (Baseball BioProject)

Darryl Strawberry Recovery Center
Darryl Strawberry Then and Now, A Tribute to Darryl Strawberry (archived)
Strawberry's Sports Grill (archived)

1962 births
African-American baseball players
African-American Christians
Albuquerque Dukes players
American people convicted of drug offenses
American people convicted of tax crimes
American sportspeople convicted of crimes
Autism activists
Baseball players from Los Angeles
Columbus Clippers players
Gulf Coast Yankees players
Jackson Mets players
Kingsport Mets players
Living people
Los Angeles Dodgers players
Lynchburg Mets players
Major League Baseball players suspended for drug offenses
Major League Baseball right fielders
Major League Baseball Rookie of the Year Award winners
National League All-Stars
National League home run champions
New York Mets players
New York Yankees players
Norwich Navigators players
Participants in American reality television series
People from South Los Angeles
Phoenix Firebirds players
San Francisco Giants players
Silver Slugger Award winners
St. Paul Saints players
Tampa Yankees players
Tiburones de La Guaira players
American expatriate baseball players in Venezuela
Tidewater Tides players
The Apprentice (franchise) contestants
Crenshaw High School alumni
21st-century African-American people
20th-century African-American sportspeople